Riley Joseph Wilson (November 12, 1871 – February 23, 1946) was a Louisiana educator, attorney and legislator in the first half of the late 19th century and the first decades of the 20th century. A Democrat, Wilson served in the United States House of Representatives from 1915 until 1937. He was defeated for renomination in 1936 by Newt V. Mills.

Biography 
Wilson was born near Goldonna in Natchitoches Parish. In 1894, he graduated from Iuka Normal Institute in Iuka in Tishomingo County in the far northeastern corner of Mississippi. From 1895 to 1897, he was the principal of Harrisonburg High School in Harrisonburg, the seat of Catahoula Parish. Wilson studied law privately, was admitted to the bar in 1898, and thereafter opened his practice in Harrisonburg.

Political career 
Prior to his service in the U.S. Congress, Wilson was a district attorney, state district court judge, and, from 1900 to 1904, a member of the Louisiana House of Representatives. He succeeded a Populist state legislator, Henry Breithaupt.

Wilson and Governor Oramel H. Simpson were the two unsuccessful gubernatorial candidates in the 1928 Democratic primary. They lost to the legendary Huey Pierce Long, Jr., at the time a member of the Louisiana Public Service Commission. Long claimed that Wilson carried the support of "a bunch of stuffed shirts calling themselves Square Dealers" whereas Simpson was backed by "a gang of cutthroats and liars from Bourbon Street brothels and those moth-eaten aristocrats sipping their booze and branch water on rich plantations."

Long claimed that Wilson and Simpson reminded him of "the old medicine man who used to come to Winnfield when I was a boy. That old faker, with his worthless cure-alls, would skin a widow woman out of her last dollar and make her think his medicine would cure anything from toe itch to whooping cough. [Wilson and Simpson] are just alike and are being supported by the same smelly medicine men."

One of Wilson's congressional aides was State Representative Rupert Peyton, who served from 1932 to 1936. Peyton was also a Shreveport journalist and historian.

Later career and death 
Wilson spent his later years in Ruston, the seat of Lincoln Parish in north Louisiana, where he died at the age of seventy-four. He is interred there at Greenwood Cemetery.

References

 . Retrieved on November 21, 2006

External links
 

Politicians from Ruston, Louisiana
People from Catahoula Parish, Louisiana
People from Goldonna, Louisiana
1946 deaths
1871 births
Educators from Louisiana
Louisiana lawyers
Democratic Party members of the Louisiana House of Representatives
Louisiana state court judges
Democratic Party members of the United States House of Representatives from Louisiana
Huey Long